The 1985 NCAA Division II football season, part of college football in the United States organized by the National Collegiate Athletic Association at the Division II level, began in August 1985, and concluded with the NCAA Division II Football Championship on December 14, 1985, at McAllen Veterans Memorial Stadium in McAllen, Texas. During the game's five-year stretch in McAllen, the "City of Palms", it was referred to as the Palm Bowl. The North Dakota State Bison defeated the North Alabama Lions, 35–7, to win their second Division II national title.

Conference changes and new programs

Conference standings

Conference summaries

Postseason

The 1985 NCAA Division II Football Championship playoffs were the 13th single-elimination tournament to determine the national champion of men's NCAA Division II college football. The championship game was held at McAllen Veterans Memorial Stadium in McAllen, Texas, for the fifth, and final, time.

Playoff bracket

See also
1985 NCAA Division I-A football season
1985 NCAA Division I-AA football season
1985 NCAA Division III football season
1985 NAIA Division I football season
1985 NAIA Division II football season

References